Michaël Llodra was the defending champion, but lost in the second round to Radek Štěpánek.

Radek Štěpánek won in the final 3–6, 6–3, 6–4, against Fernando Verdasco.

Seeds

Draw

Finals

Top half

Bottom half

Qualifying

Seeds

Qualifiers

Draw

First qualifier

Second qualifier

Third qualifier

Fourth qualifier

External links
Draw
Qualifying Draw

2009 ATP World Tour
Men's Singles